Brenda Mary Robertson  (née Tubb, May 23, 1929 – September 23, 2020) was a Canadian politician who served as Senator. She was the first woman elected to the Legislative Assembly of New Brunswick and the first woman to become a cabinet minister in the province.

Life
Born in Sussex, New Brunswick, she was elected to the Legislative Assembly of New Brunswick representing the district of Albert in 1967 and was re-elected four times (1970, 1974, 1978, and 1982) representing the district of Riverview. In 1970, she was appointed Youth Minister. She was also Minister of Social Welfare, Minister of Social Services, Minister of Health, and Minister for Social Program Reform. She remained a Member until her appointment to the Senate on December 21, 1984 representing the senatorial division of Riverview, New Brunswick. She sat as a Progressive Conservative and a Conservative until her retirement on her 75th birthday in 2004. She died on September 23, 2020 at the age of 91.

Honours
In 2004, she was made a Member of the Order of New Brunswick in honour of "her tremendous work ethic and commitment to serve New Brunswickers and her country." In 2008, she was made a Member of the Order of Canada in recognition of being a "trailblazer and role model for women in politics".

She received an honorary degree of Doctor of Humane Letters from Mount St. Vincent University in 1973 and an honorary degree of Doctor of Social Science from University of Moncton in 1983.

References

Canadian senators from New Brunswick
Women members of the Senate of Canada
Conservative Party of Canada senators
Progressive Conservative Party of New Brunswick MLAs
Members of the Executive Council of New Brunswick
Members of the Order of Canada
Members of the Order of New Brunswick
Members of the United Church of Canada
People from Kings County, New Brunswick
Progressive Conservative Party of Canada senators
Women MLAs in New Brunswick
1929 births
2020 deaths
21st-century Canadian politicians
21st-century Canadian women politicians